Galanta is a town (about 15,000 inhabitants) in the Trnava Region of Slovakia. It is situated 50 km due east of the Slovak capital Bratislava.

Etymology
The name is derived from a Slavic name Golęta (initially a collective name of a youth group selected from a kin and responsible for guarding).  A pre-Hungarian origin of the settlement is documented by the Proto-Slavic nasal "ę" conserved in the name (GalaNta; compare with Czech Holetín and Holetice).

Geography
Galanta lies in the Danubian Lowland (Podunajská nížina), the warm southern part of Slovakia. There are many agricultural fields around Galanta, where wheat, corn, and other vegetables and fruits are grown.

History
The land around Galanta has almost continuously been inhabited since the neolithic. From the second half of the 10th century until 1918, it was part of the Kingdom of Hungary. The first written record of Galanta was made in 1237 in a Royal Decree by Béla IV of Hungary. Through the years, the settlement was under the lordship of various noble families including the Esterházy de Galantha and the Fekete de Galantha. Beginning in 1421, the Eszterházy family ruled the town and the surrounding area. In 1613 or 1614, Galanta was promoted to a free market town. After break-up of Austria-Hungary in 1918/1920, the town became part of newly created Czechoslovakia. As a result of the First Vienna Award, it returned to Hungary between 1938 and 1945. On 31 March 1945, Galanta was captured by troops of the Soviet 2nd Ukrainian Front and became again part of Czechoslovakia.

Features
Galanta is an old town where most historical buildings have unfortunately been damaged or destroyed in World War II. During the Communist era of Czechoslovakia (1948–1989) the architecture of the town has further deteriorated as historic buildings were razed and replaced by prefabricated concrete apartment complexes and buildings. There are two important historical buildings left. The first one is Esterházys' Neo-Gothic Castle and the second one is the Renaissance castle (the two are often referred to as manor houses rather than castles). The Esterházys' Neo-Gothic Castle is in a state of disrepair and has been closed to the public since the late 1980s. The Renaissance castle was renovated in the 1990s and is being used as a museum, exhibition space and cultural center.

Demographics
According to the 2021 census, the town had 15,052 inhabitants. 63.07% of inhabitants were Slovaks, 27.72% Hungarians, 0.17% Roma and 0.50% Czechs. The religious makeup was 49.72% Roman Catholics, 32.62% people with no religious affiliation and 4.07% Lutherans.

In 1910, 89.6% of the population reported Hungarian as primary language, 6.2% Slovak, 3.5% German or Yiddish. The religious make-up was  65.3% Roman Catholic, 32.4% Jewish and 1.3% Lutheran.

Notable citizens
The Hungarian composer Zoltán Kodály spent most of his childhood in this town and composed the Dances of Galánta (1933, for orchestra) based on the folk music of this region.

Famous people 
 František Valábek (*1907 – † 1980), SDB,  Roman Catholic priest end religious prisoner (sentenced to 6 years in prison).

Twin towns — sister cities

Galanta is twinned with:

 Albignasego, Italy (2007)
 Mikulov, Czech Republic (2003)
 Paks, Hungary (1998)
 Tótkomlós, Hungary (1999)
 Kecskemét, Hungary (1998)
 Liptovský Mikuláš, Slovakia (2006)
 Bečej, Serbia (2001)

References

External links

Official website

Cities and towns in Slovakia